A black cat is a domestic cat with black fur that may be a mixed or specific breed, or a common domestic cat of no particular breed. The Cat Fanciers' Association (CFA) recognizes 22 cat breeds that can come with solid black coats. The Bombay breed is exclusively black. All-black fur pigmentation is slightly more prevalent in male cats than female cats. Most black cats have golden irises due to their high melanin pigment content. In popular myths, witches are believed to be associated with black cats.

Coat 

Any cat whose fur is a single color, including black, is known as a "solid" or "self". A "solid black" cat may be coal black, grayish black, or brownish black. Most solid-colored cats result from a recessive gene that suppresses the tabby pattern. Sometimes the tabby pattern is not completely suppressed; faint markings may appear in certain lights, even on a solid black cat. A cat having black fur with white roots is known as a "black smoke".

Black cats can also "rust" in sunlight, the coat turning a lighter brownish-red shade. Eumelanin, the pigment required to produce the black fur, is somewhat fragile, so the rusting effect can be more pronounced in cats that frequently spend time in the sun. A rarer situation that can also cause rusting is a deficiency of the amino acid tyrosine, which is required to produce eumelanin.

In addition to the Bombay, the Cat Fanciers' Association allows solid black as a color option in 21 other breeds. The color description for those breeds is:

Black: dense coal black, sound from roots to tip of fur. Free from any tinge of rust on the ends. Nose leather: black. Paw pads: black or brown.

The exceptions are:
 Oriental – Ebony: dense coal black. Free from any tinge of rust on tips or smoke undercoat. Nose leather: black. Paw pads: black or brown.
 Sphynx – Black: black. One level tone from nose to tip of the tail. Nose leather: black. Paw pads: black or brown.
 Ragamuffin – Although black is not specifically mentioned, the standard allows for "any color, with or without white", so technically speaking, an all-black Ragamuffin would be allowed under the breed standard.

Historical associations

As a positive omen in Britain and Ireland 

The superstitions surrounding black cats varies from culture to culture, but black cats have positive associations in the Celtic nations and Japanese folklore. Black cats were sacred in Celtic mythology. Scottish lore holds that a black cat's arrival at a new home signifies prosperity, while Welsh lore states that a black cat brings good health:

However, both the Gaels and Celtic Britons had traditions of feral and sometimes malevolent black cats. In Scottish mythology, a fairy known as the Cat sìth takes the form of a black cat, while in Welsh mythology the monstrous Cath Palug grew from a black kitten. In England, as with other Germanic cultures, some areas would associate black cats with witches and bad luck.

The mix of positive and negative associations in Great Britain may have given rise to the later belief that black cats were omens of both good and bad luck. One tradition states that if a black cat walks towards someone, it is said to bring good fortune, but if it walks away, it takes the good luck with it. This tradition was reversed at sea where 18th century pirates came to believe that a black cat would bring bad luck if it walks towards someone, and good luck if it walks away from someone. It was also believed that if a black cat walks onto a ship and then walks off it, the ship is doomed to sink on its next trip. Furthermore, it is believed that a lady who owns a black cat will have many suitors.

Superstition, prejudice, bringer of good or bad luck 

Black cats are often a symbol of Halloween or witchcraft. In most Western cultures, black cats have typically been looked upon as a symbol of evil omens, specifically being suspected of being the familiars of witches, or actually shape-shifting witches themselves. Most of Europe considers the black cat a symbol of bad luck, particularly if one walks across the path in front of a person, which is believed to be an omen of misfortune and death. In Germany, some believe that black cats crossing a person's path from right to left, is a bad omen, but from left to right, the cat is granting favorable times.

The black cat in folklore has been able to change into human shape to act as a spy or courier for witches or demons. When the Pilgrims arrived at Plymouth Rock, they brought with them a devout faith in the Bible. They also brought a deepening suspicion of anything deemed of Satan and were deeply suspicious of other Christians, including those of the Catholic, Quaker, Anglican and Baptist denominations. The Pilgrims viewed the black cat as a companion, or a familiar to witches, who were said to "use black cats as an integral part of their craft". These superstitions led people to kill black cats. There is no evidence from England of regular large-scale massacres of "Satanic" cats, or of burning them in midsummer bonfires, as sometimes occurred elsewhere in Europe. In the present day many Westerners, including Christian clergy, have black cats as pets, and very few people attach superstitions to them anymore.

In contrast, the supernatural powers ascribed to black cats were sometimes viewed positively; for example, sailors considering a "ship's cat" would want a black one because it would bring good luck. Sometimes, fishermen's wives would keep black cats at home too, in the hope that they would be able to use their influence to protect their husbands at sea.

In the folklore of Chiloé of southern Chile, black cats are an important element that is needed when hunting for the treasure of the carbunclo.

In the early days of television in the United States, many stations located on VHF channel 13 used a black cat as a mascot in order to make sport of being located on an "unlucky" channel number.

Anarcho-syndicalism 

Since the 1880s, the color black has been associated with anarchism. The black cat, in an alert, fighting stance was later adopted as an anarchist symbol.

More specifically, the black cat—often called the "sab cat" or "sabo-tabby"—is associated with anarcho-syndicalism, a branch of anarchism that focuses on labor organizing, including the use of wildcat strikes.

In testimony before the court in a 1918 trial of Industrial Workers of the World leaders, Ralph Chaplin, who is generally credited with creating the IWW's black cat symbol, stated that the black cat "was commonly used by the boys as representing the idea of sabotage. The idea being to frighten the employer by the mention of the name sabotage, or by putting a black cat somewhere around. You know if you saw a black cat go across your path you would think, if you were superstitious, you are going to have a little bad luck. The idea of sabotage is to use a little black cat on the boss."

Space Shuttle program 

When the Space Shuttle program naming system for missions was reworked to avoid a Space Transportation System (STS)-13, some sourced this to superstition and Apollo 13. The crew for what would have been STS-13 (which turned out to be STS-41C) made a humorous mission patch that included a black cat and a number 13. The mission was successful and even landed on Friday the 13th.

Notable black cats 

The UK Government has adopted several cats from Battersea Dogs & Cats Home as mousers. Gladstone is known as the Chief Mouser of HM Treasury. India, also known as Willie, was a presidential cat owned by George W. Bush and Laura Bush who lived with them at the White House. 

Trim sailed with Matthew Flinders as he mapped the coastline of Australia between 1801 and 1803. Trim now accompanies him on several statues in Australia and England. Hodge (fl. ) was a cat belonging to Samuel Johnson. Most of what is known about Hodge comes from James Boswell's biography and a statue of Hodge stands outside Dr Johnson's House.

Oscar the "bionic" cat had his back legs sliced off by a combine harvester whilst sleeping in a field in Jersey. He was flown to the UK and received prosthetic limbs in an innovative operation in 2010.

Adoption and Black Cat Day  

Black cats have been found to have lower odds of adoption in American shelters compared to other colors except brown, although black animals in general take more time to find homes. Some shelters also suspend or limit adoptions of black cats around Halloween for fear they will be tortured, or used as "living decorations" for the holiday and then abandoned. Despite this, no one has ever documented in the history of humane work any relationship between adopting black cats and cats being killed or injured. When such killings are reported, forensic evidence has pointed to natural predators, such as coyotes, eagles, or raptors as the likely cause. Limiting or suspending adoptions around Halloween also places more cats of all colors at risk of dying in shelters due to overcrowding.

October 27 has been designated 'Black Cat Day' by Cats Protection in the United Kingdom of Great Britain and Northern Ireland, to celebrate the virtues of black cats and to encourage people to adopt an unwanted black cat. Cats Protection's own figures suggest that black cats are more difficult for them to find a new home for than other colors. In 2014, the RSPCA reported that 70% of the abandoned cats in its care were black, suggesting a possible reason was that people considered black cats "un-photogenic".

In the United States, August 17 is "Black Cat Appreciation Day". Wayne H. Morris created the day in honor of his late sister, June, who had a black cat, Sinbad. The day was chosen in memorial of June's passing. Research by the ASPCA shows that black cats are the least likely to be adopted from shelters of any type of cat. This can be partly because of the superstition behind black cats such as their association with witchcraft or bad luck, or because they appear dull next to more colorful cats. In 2014 Toronto, Canada's largest city, held an event on Black Friday during which people could adopt a black cat without paying the usual $75 adoption fee, in order to encourage the adoption of black cats. This trend has now spread across the United States, with many shelters offering free adoption of black cats on Black Friday.

With the success of the 2018 African-themed superhero film, Black Panther, there was a fad of adopting black domestic cats as pets and naming them after various characters of the film, such as T'Challa and Shuri. It has been observed that usually people were not going out of their way to follow this fad, but visited animal shelters to simply adopt a pet under normal circumstances and were inspired by the Black Panther to adopt a black cat when they see one. Regardless, as much as this was a welcome development for pets that are difficult to get adopted, to reduce the chance of such cats being abandoned when the fad fades, reputable animal shelter personnel took the usual precautions of having potential adopters fill out questionnaires to weed out potentially abusive guardians and have them read literature about the needs and responsibilities of such a pet to dissuade the less conscientious.

See also 

 Black dog syndrome 
 Black panther
 Black tiger
 Black squirrel
 Kellas cat, a medium-size black hybrid cat resulting from interbreeding between domestic cats and the Scottish wildcat 
 Melanism

References 

Anarchist symbols
Anarcho-syndicalism
Cat, black
Cat coat types
Cat folklore
Cats as pets
Cats in popular culture
Folklore
Industrial Workers of the World culture
Luck
Witchcraft